The Taichung Basin is located in the central region of western Taiwan. It occupies some parts of Taichung City, Nantou County and Changhua County. The basin borders the Choshui River in the south; the hill lands of Nantou in the east; the Tatu Plateau in the northwest; and the Pakua Plateau in the southwest. A notch connecting the Taichung Basin to the seacoast of Taichung City stretches between the two plateaus.

Panoramic photography

See also
 Geography of Taiwan

Drainage basins of Taiwan
Landforms of Nantou County
Landforms of Taichung